PCC may refer to:

Science and technology
 Pearson correlation coefficient (r), in statistics
 Periodic counter-current chromatography, a type of affinity chromatography
 Portable C Compiler, an early compiler for the C programming language
 Precipitated calcium carbonate, a chemical compound
 Proof-carrying code, a software mechanism that allows a host system to verify properties
 Pyridinium chlorochromate, a yellow-orange salt
 Pyrolytic chromium carbide coating, by vacuum deposition

Medicine
 Pericardiocentesis, a procedure where fluid is aspirated from the pericardium
 Pheochromocytoma, a neuroendocrine tumor
 Posterior cingulate cortex, an anatomical brain region
 Prothrombin complex concentrate, a medication
 Propionyl-CoA carboxylase, catalyses the carboxylation reaction of propionyl CoA in the mitochondrial matrix
 1-piperidinocyclohexanecarbonitrile, a precursor schedule II drug in the US

Organizations
 C. Paul Phelps Correctional Center
 Clef Club of Jazz and Performing Arts
 Pacific Coast Conference, a defunct US college athletic conference
 Pacific Coffee Company
 Pacific Conference of Churches, the regional ecumenical organization in the Pacific region
 Pakistan Christian Congress
 Palmarian Catholic Church 
 Panama Canal Commission
 PCC Community Markets, a food cooperative based in Seattle, Washington, US
 PCC SE, a German company
 Pentecost Convention Centre
 People's Computer Company
 Peoria Charter Coach Company, a bus company in Illinois, US
 Plains Conservation Center
 Plainfield Curling Club
 Polynesian Cultural Center
 Power Computing Corporation
 Power Corporation of Canada
 Pradesh Congress Committee, in India
 Precision Castparts Corp. in Portland, Oregon, US
 Presbyterian Church in Canada
 Press Complaints Commission, a voluntary regulatory body for British printed newspapers and magazines
 Primeiro Comando da Capital, a Brazilian prison gang-terrorist group
 Printed Circuit Corporation, US

Education
 Pabna Cadet College
 Palmer College of Chiropractic
 Pasadena City College
 Penola Catholic College
 Pensacola Christian College
 Piedmont Community College
 Pima Community College
 Pitt Community College
 Pobalscoil Chloich Cheannfhaola
 Polk Community College, former name of Polk State College
 Portland Community College
 Presentation College, Chaguanas
 Pueblo Community College
 Punjab College of Commerce

Government and politics
 Palestinian Central Council
 Palestinian Conciliation Commission
 Parochial church council in the Church of England 
 Patents County Court, former name of the Intellectual Property Enterprise Court in the United Kingdom
 Philippine Competition Commission, independent quasi-judicial body of the Philippine government in charge of implementing the Philippine Competition Act
 Poison control center
 Police and crime commissioner, in England and Wales
 Porirua City Council, New Zealand
 Perth City Council, Australia 
 Partido Comunista Colombiano, the Colombian Communist Party
 Partido Comunista de Canarias, the Communist Party of the Canaries
 Partido Comunista de Cuba, the Communist Party of Cuba
 Partit dels i les Comunistes de Catalunya, Party of the Communists of Catalonia
 Pradesh Congress Committee, the provincial committee of the Congress Party in India
 Privacy Commissioner of Canada
 Public Construction Commission, a government agency in Taiwan

Transportation
 PCC streetcar (Presidents’ Conference Committee)
 PCC streetcar in Toronto
 Personal Car Communicator, in Volvo Cars
 Pseudo city code, in air travel
 Pure car carrier, a type of roll-on/roll-off ship

Other uses
 Phoenix Comicon
 Pistol-caliber carbine
 Police clearance certificate
 Polymer City Chronicles, a webcomic
 Portland cement concrete
 Porsche Carrera Cup
 Pregnancy care center
 Protected cell company
 Puyi language (an ISO 639-3 language code: pcc)

See also
 Philippine Collegiate Champions League (PCCL)